Samuel Laird Galbraith (18 October 1945 – 18 August 2014) was a Scottish politician and neurosurgeon who served as Minister for Environment, Sport and Culture from 2000 to 2001 and Minister for Children and Education from 1999 to 2000. Galbraith was a Member of the Scottish Parliament (MSP) for Strathkelvin and Bearsden from 1999 to 2001, and a Member of Parliament (MP) in the British House of Commons for the equivalent seat from 1987 to 2001. 

The Labour/Liberal Democrat coalition faced demands from Scottish National Party (SNP) politicians, including future First Minister Nicola Sturgeon, for Galbraith to resign after the SQA examinations controversy in 2000.

Early life
Galbraith was born in Clitheroe, Lancashire, to Samuel Galbraith and Catherine Navin.  He was educated at Greenock High School. He studied at Glasgow University, where he received honours in medicine. Galbraith was a respected neurosurgeon, who worked at Glasgow's Southern General Hospital.

Political career
At the 1987 general election, he was returned as Member of Parliament for the Strathkelvin and Bearsden constituency, and held the seat until standing down at the 2001 general election. He was a Scottish Office Minister between 1997 and 1999.

Galbraith served as Minister for Children and Education in the Scottish Executive under Donald Dewar from 1999 to 2000 and then as Minister for Environment, Sport and Culture. On 20 March 2001 he announced his resignation from ministerial office and his parliamentary seats for health reasons.

Personal life
He was married in 1987 to Nicola Tennant, and they had three daughters, Mhairi, Heather and Fiona. In prior years he was an avid mountaineer who had climbed all the Munros and also climbed in the Alps and Himalayas.

Galbraith received a lung transplant in 1990, at Freeman's Hospital Newcastle (where he continued to receive treatment), due to fibrosing alveolitis, a condition that his elder sister died from.

From 2006 he was chairman of the Scottish Maritime Museum with facilities at Irvine, North Ayrshire and Dumbarton.

He died on 18 August 2014.

References

External links 
 

1945 births
2014 deaths
Scottish Labour MPs
Labour MSPs
Ministers of the Scottish Government
UK MPs 1987–1992
UK MPs 1992–1997
UK MPs 1997–2001
Members of the Scottish Parliament 1999–2003
Scottish surgeons
Scottish neurosurgeons
20th-century Scottish medical doctors
Lung transplant recipients
People from Greenock
Alumni of the University of Glasgow
20th-century surgeons